Dennis Eugene Hedke (born October 1, 1952) is an American politician. He has served as a Republican member for the 99th district in the Kansas House of Representatives since 2011. The American Conservative Union gave him a lifetime rating of 88%.

References

1952 births
Living people
Republican Party members of the Kansas House of Representatives
American geophysicists
21st-century American politicians
Kansas State University alumni